Jonnie is a unisex given name. It is a variant form of Jonny.

People with the name
 John Alvin Ray (1927-1990), American singer, songwriter, and pianist
 Jonnie Barnett (1946-2002), American musician
 Jonnie Craig (born 1988), English photographer
 Jonnie Fedel (born 1966), Swedish football coach
 Jonnie Juice (born 1984), New Zealand professional wrestler
 Jonnie Nicely (born 1936), American model
 Jonnie Peacock (born 1993), British Paralympic runner

See also

 John (given name)
 Johnny (given name)
 Johny (disambiguation)
 Jonathan (name)
 Joni (disambiguation)
 Jonie
 Jonn
 Jonni
 Jony

English masculine given names
English unisex given names
Unisex given names